John Powell (3 June 1892 – 7 February 1961) was an English footballer who played as a goalkeeper for Port Vale and Nottingham Forest.

Career
Powell joined Port Vale in 1911, and made his debut in a 1–0 defeat at Lincoln City in a Central League match on 25 December 1911. He remained as the club's back-up goalkeeper for the next three seasons. He went on to play 21 Second Division matches for Nottingham Forest in the 1914–15 season. He returned to Port Vale during World War I, and played as a guest from August 1916 until he lost his first team place in September 1917.

Career statistics
Source:

References

1892 births
1961 deaths
Sportspeople from Burslem
English footballers
Association football goalkeepers
Port Vale F.C. players
Nottingham Forest F.C. players
Port Vale F.C. wartime guest players
English Football League players